Paracrossochilus is a genus of cyprinid fishes containing two species, both of which are endemic to Borneo.

Species
 Paracrossochilus acerus Inger & P. K. Chin, 1962
 Paracrossochilus vittatus (Boulenger, 1894)

References
 

Cyprinid fish of Asia
Labeoninae
Cyprinidae genera
Taxa named by Canna Maria Louise Popta